The men's 200 metre freestyle event at the 11th FINA World Swimming Championships (25m) took place 12 December 2012 at the Sinan Erdem Dome.

Records
Prior to this competition, the existing world and championship records were as follows.

No new records were set during this competition.

Results

Heats
88 swimmers participated in 10 heats.

Final
The final was held at 19:00.

References

External links
 2012 FINA World Swimming Championships (25 m): Men's 200 metre freestyle entry list, from OmegaTiming.com.

Freestyle 0200 metre, men's
World Short Course Swimming Championships